Elisa Holopainen (born 27 December 2001) is a Finnish ice hockey winger and member of the Finnish national team, currently playing in the Finnish Naisten Liiga (NSML) with KalPa Kuopio. One of the most dominant players active in the Naisten Liiga, she has been named the Naisten Liiga Player of the Year twice, Best Forward four times, and is a five-time All-Star team selection.

Holopainen represented Finland in the women's ice hockey tournament at the 2022 Winter Olympics in Beijing, where she won a bronze medal, and at the IIHF Women's World Championships in 2019, 2021, and 2022.

International play
With the senior national team, she won a silver medal at the 2019 IIHF Women's World Championship. Holopainen was officially named to the Finnish roster for the 2020 IIHF Women's World Championship days before the tournament was cancelled due to public health concerns related to COVID-19.

She appeared with the Finnish under-18 national team at the IIHF Women's U18 World Championships in 2017, 2018, and 2019. Finland claimed the bronze medal at the 2019 IIHF World Women's U18 Championship, due in no small part to Holopainen’s tournament leading 8 points from 5 goals and three assists in five games. She was named Best Forward by the tournament directorate and selected to the media All-Star team, in addition to being recognized as a top-3 player for Finland by the coaches.

Career statistics

Regular season and playoffs

International

Honors and achievements 

Sources:

References

External links
 
 

2001 births
Living people
Finnish ice hockey left wingers
Finnish women's ice hockey forwards
Ice hockey players at the 2022 Winter Olympics
Kiekko-Espoo Naiset players
KalPa Naiset players
Medalists at the 2022 Winter Olympics
Naisten Liiga All-Stars
Olympic bronze medalists for Finland
Olympic ice hockey players of Finland
Olympic medalists in ice hockey
People from Tuusniemi
Sportspeople from North Savo